South Wales Central was a European Parliament constituency covering south central Wales, including the city of Cardiff.

Prior to its uniform adoption of proportional representation in 1999, the United Kingdom used first-past-the-post for the European elections in England, Scotland and Wales. The European Parliament constituencies used under that system were smaller than the later regional constituencies and only had one Member of the European Parliament each.

The constituency consisted of the Westminster Parliament constituencies (on their 1983 boundaries) of Cardiff Central, Cardiff North, Cardiff South and Penarth, Cardiff West, Cynon Valley, Pontypridd, Rhondda, and Vale of Glamorgan.

The constituency replaced most of South Wales and the Cynon Valley area of South Wales East in 1994 and became part of the much larger Wales constituency in 1999.

Members of the European Parliament

Results

References

External links
 David Boothroyd's United Kingdom Election Results

European Parliament constituencies in Wales (1979–1999)
1994 establishments in Wales
1999 disestablishments in Wales
Constituencies established in 1994
Constituencies disestablished in 1999